The 2009–10 Curaçao Sekshon Pagá was the 2009–10 season of the Curaçao Sekshon Pagá.

Final
The 2010 Curaçao Sekshon Pagá Final was a football match that took place on 15 August 2010 at Stadion Ergilio Hato in Willemstad, Curaçao, to determine the winner of the 2010 Curaçao League Final. Hubentut Fortuna defeated the Centro Social Deportivo Barber 1–0 with a goal from Tyrone Maria four his team.

References

Curaçao Sekshon Pagá seasons
1